The Honourable Woman is a 2014 British political spy thriller television miniseries in eight parts, directed and written by Hugo Blick for the BBC and SundanceTV. Featuring Maggie Gyllenhaal in the title role, it aired on BBC Two in the United Kingdom on 3 July 2014 and premiered on SundanceTV in the United States on 31 July 2014. An advance screening of the series was held on 7 April 2014 at the MIPTV Media Market.

The Honourable Woman received positive reviews, with Gyllenhaal winning a Golden Globe Award for her performance, Stephen Rea winning the 2015 British Academy Television Award for Best Supporting Actor and the series was awarded a Peabody Award in 2015.

Synopsis 
Eight years after taking over the family company from her brother Ephra Stein, Anglo-Jewish businesswoman Nessa Stein is made a life peer for her continued commitment to the Middle East peace process. She becomes The Rt Hon. Baroness Stein of Tilbury.

When her new business partner dies in a mysterious suicide, Lady Stein is forced to delay the third phase of an ambitious and long-planned project: connecting the West Bank with optical fibre cables. Various stakeholders manoeuvre for influence in connection with this venture.

The stakes become the highest possible for the family when Kasim, the son of Atika Halabi, a Palestinian translator/housekeeper and Nessa Stein's very close friend, is kidnapped. Soon, a mystery around his parentage comes to light, and further secrets are revealed.

Cast and characters

Main cast 
 Maggie Gyllenhaal as Nessa Stein, Baroness Stein of Tilbury, an Anglo-Jewish businesswoman who eight years earlier became the new head of the Stein Group after her brother abruptly stepped down, and who has just been appointed a life peer because of her philanthropic work with her company.
 Andrew Buchan as Ephra Stein, Nessa's brother, who successfully ran the family business for a number of years until he suddenly handed over the reins to his sister eight years earlier and took a back seat.
 Stephen Rea as Sir Hugh Hayden-Hoyle, Bt, the outgoing head of MI6's Middle East desk.
 Lubna Azabal as Atika Halabi, a Palestinian translator who is a close friend of Nessa's and Ephra's housekeeper.
 Janet McTeer as Dame Julia Walsh, the head of MI6.
 Katherine Parkinson as Rachel Stein, Ephra's very pregnant wife.
 Tobias Menzies as Nathaniel Bloom, Nessa's personal bodyguard.
 Eve Best as Monica Chatwin, an ambitious British Foreign Office tactician stationed in Washington, D.C.
 Igal Naor as Shlomo Zahary, an Israeli businessman and surrogate uncle to Nessa and Ephra.
 Genevieve O'Reilly as Frances Pirsig, Nessa's private secretary and confidante.
 Lindsay Duncan as Anjelica, Lady Hayden-Hoyle, Hayden-Hoyle's ex-wife.
 Philip Arditti as Saleh Al-Zahid, a Palestinian who commits malevolent acts towards the Stein family for reasons eventually revealed.

Hugo Blick re-uses several actors from his previous series The Shadow Line (e.g. Stephen Rea, Tobias Menzies and Eve Best).

Recurring cast 

 Nasser Memarzia as Zahid Al-Zahid
 Oliver Bodur as Kasim Halabi
 Adnan Rashed as Samir Meshal
 Raad Rawi as Jalal El-Amin
 Julia Montgomery Brown as Rebecca Lantham aka Tracy
 Nicholas Woodeson as Israeli diplomat Judah Ben-Shahar
 Richard Katz as Aron Yavin
 John MacKay as Caleb Schwako
 Lachele Carl as US Secretary of State
 Laurel Lefkow as Kate Larsson, special advisor to the Secretary of State
 Paul Herzberg as Daniel Borgoraz
 Martin Hutson as MI6 agent Max Boorman
 Martin McDougall as Brigadier General Berkoff
 George Georgiou as Palestinian diplomat Magdi Muraji
 Uriel Emil as Shimon Ben Reuven
 Claire-Louise Cordwell as Gail Gatz
 Jacob Krichefski as Yaniv Levi
 Justin Shevlin as Tom Crace
 Aidan Stephenson as Eli Stein', Nessa's father
 Lois Ellington as young Nessa

Episodes

Production 
The eight-part series was announced in June 2013. It was commissioned by Ben Stephenson (Controller, BBC Drama Commissioning) and Janice Hadlow (Controller, BBC Two), and co-funded by the Sundance Channel. Written and directed by Hugo Blick, it was made by production companies Drama Republic and Eight Rooks, with Hugo Blick and Abi Bach as producers.

Stephenson describes the drama as "really grown up, complicated" and said he was keen to work with Blick again following the 2011 series The Shadow Line. The President of the Sundance Channel Sarah Barnett said that it is "a superbly wrought character piece about hope, compromise, guilt and families". Speaking about her casting, Gyllenhaal said: "I couldn't put the scripts down. Nessa is such an exciting and intricate character. I can't wait to begin filming."

Filming 
The three-month filming schedule began in July 2013 in London and Romney Marsh in Kent, with further filming in the Middle East and the United States. Gyllenhaal's performance was informed by private decisions she made about her character's life; for example, she decided that Nessa was 104 years old, and that she was high on mushrooms in one scene. Gyllenhaal did not share these choices with Blick because she did not think he would understand.

Reception

Critical response 
The series was warmly received upon its initial debut in the UK, with The Guardians Gabriel Tate summarising the series as "the most satisfying, densely plotted TV series for years."

The Honorable Woman (retitled to follow American spelling) premiered in the United States, with strong reviews coming from The New York Times, The Washington Post, New York, Entertainment Weekly, Time and the Los Angeles Times, and received a Metacritic score of 82 out of 100 based on 24 reviews, indicating "universal acclaim". Particular raves came from Matt Roush of TV Guide, who described Blick's work as "written and directed with ruthless intelligence," and Tim Goodman of The Hollywood Reporter, calling the miniseries "a spectacularly well-constructed story—intricate, dense, demanding and rewarding.

Specific notices focused on Gyllenhaal—Hank Stuever of The Washington Post described her performance as "remarkably measured and moving," while Alessandra Stanley of The New York Times said "Ms. Gyllenhaal is remarkable playing a principled but conflicted woman whose quicksilver personality alters from hour to hour and flashback to flash-forward" and on the series' mature treatment of gender roles. Sara Stewart of Indiewire credited The Honourable Woman with "upending the sexy spy drama," celebrating it for favouring the protagonist's intellect and interior complexity over romantic and sexual conflict. Sarah Chalmers of The Telegraph, meanwhile, said: "For here, at last, is a new kind of female protagonist: one not only driving the drama and outwitting the male characters, but looking amazing as she does so."

Responses in the UK to the series' conclusion were extremely positive. Julia Raeside of The Guardian wrote that it concluded as a "taut and perfectly controlled thriller ... something truly special." Nicholas Blincoe of The Telegraph, claimed that the series achieved the "must-watch" label of the summer.

The ending of The Honourable Woman was met with raves in the US; Willa Paskin of Slate praised the conclusion, explaining that "The Honorable Woman, unlike so many series that claim to do so, genuinely complicates notions of villainhood and herodom. It does not shortchange historical atrocity, pooh-pooh grievances, or whitewash systematic injustices." Tim Goodman of The Hollywood Reporter said, in terms of the series' conclusion, "Few things this dense and ambitious are able to stick the landing when the last act comes, but The Honorable Woman does it with aplomb." A more critical look at the series as a whole came from Sonia Saraiya at The A.V. Club, who explained that "The story lobs so many ideas into the air that it can't possibly give them all a safe landing. But along the way to the ending, The Honorable Woman is enthralling—a beautiful, dark portrait of a woman against the backdrop of the continued conflict between Israel and Palestine."

The series ranked on several publications' year-end top 10 lists, including The Hollywood Reporter, the Los Angeles Times, The Wall Street Journal, The Guardian and Grantland.

Accolades 
For the 72nd Golden Globe Awards, Maggie Gyllenhaal won for Best Actress – Miniseries or Television Film. For the 21st Screen Actors Guild Awards, Gyllenhaal was nominated for Best Female Actor in a TV Movie or Miniseries. For the 5th Critics' Choice Television Awards, it received three nominations, for Best Limited Series Series, Gyllenhaal for Best Actress in a Movie or Limited Series, and Janet McTeer for Best Supporting Actress in a Movie or Limited Series. The series was nominated for the 2015 TCA Award for Outstanding Achievement in Movies, Miniseries and Specials.

The Honourable Woman was awarded with a 2014 Peabody Award, with the organisation writing: "A visually rich, densely-plotted thriller set against the backdrop of the Israeli-Palestine conflict, it suggests complexities and age-old vendettas that often escape even the best documentaries, to say nothing of the evening news."

For the 67th Primetime Emmy Awards, the series received nominations for Outstanding Limited Series, Maggie Gyllenhaal for Outstanding Lead Actress in a Limited Series or a Movie, and Hugo Blick for both Outstanding Directing and Outstanding Writing for a Limited Series, Movie or a Dramatic Special.

Home media release 
The Honourable Woman was released on DVD in the UK on 1 September 2014, in the US on 14 October 2014, and in Canada on 25 November 2014.

The series was released on Blu-ray Disc in the UK on 20 July 2015.

References

External links 

The Guardian blog by episode: 1, 2, 3, 4, 5, 6, 7, 8

2014 British television series debuts
2014 British television series endings
2010s British drama television series
BBC television dramas
2010s British political television series
2010s British television miniseries
English-language television shows
Nonlinear narrative television series
Peabody Award-winning television programs
Rape in television
Sundance TV original programming
Television shows set in London
Television shows scored by Natalie Holt